Courgenay railway station is a railway station in the municipality of Courgenay, in the Swiss canton of Jura. It is an intermediate stop on the standard gauge Delémont–Delle line of Swiss Federal Railways.

Services 
The following services stop at Courgenay, combining for half-hourly service in both directions:

 RegioExpress: hourly service between Meroux or Delle and Biel/Bienne.
 Basel S-Bahn : hourly service between Porrentruy and Olten.

References

External links 
 
 

Railway stations in the canton of Jura
Swiss Federal Railways stations